The 1984 United States presidential election in Pennsylvania took place on November 6, 1984, and was part of the 1984 United States presidential election. Voters chose 25 representatives, or electors to the Electoral College, who voted for president and vice president.

Pennsylvania voted for the Republican nominee, President Ronald Reagan, over the Democratic nominee, former Vice President Walter Mondale. Reagan won Pennsylvania by a margin of 7.35%, making Pennsylvania 5.5% more Democratic than the nation at large.

Reagan won the state by sweeping the small towns and rural areas of central Pennsylvania and performing well in the traditionally Republican suburbs of Philadelphia, but the race was kept within single digits by Mondale’s strong showing in traditionally Democratic Western Pennsylvania, along with decisive double-digit wins in the cities of Pittsburgh and Philadelphia. , this is the last election in which Lackawanna County voted Republican, the last time Erie County gave a majority to a Republican, and the last time a Republican won one-third of the vote in Philadelphia. 

It was, along with the two Dwight D. Eisenhower/Adlai Stevenson II elections of 1952 and 1956, one of only three elections since the Civil War in which Pennsylvania voted more Democratic than neighboring New York. It is also the most recent election where Pennsylvania voted to the left of Illinois, Washington, and Hawaii. The state voted 5.5 more Democratic than the nation as a whole. Reagan became the first Republican ever to win the White House without carrying Mercer or Armstrong Counties.

Primaries

Republican Primary
Ronald Reagan ran uncontested, winning 616,916 votes (Turnout: 27.66%)

Democratic Primary

Results

Results by county

See also
 List of United States presidential elections in Pennsylvania

References

Pennsylvania
1984
1984 Pennsylvania elections